Bol.com is a webshop in the Netherlands and offers general merchandising products in categories such as music, film, electronics, toys, jewelry, watches, baby products, gardening, and DIY. As of 2020, the store serves 11 million active customers in the Netherlands and Belgium and offers over 23 million items. Since 2011, bol.com has also opened its webshop for retailers to sell and effectively became a platform. Since the introduction of "Selling via bol.com", more than 30,000 retailers have already sold via bol.com. The company employs approximately 3,000 workers.

History
The company was founded on 30 March 1999 by Bertelsmann as 'Bertelsmann On-Line'.  In 2003, it was sold to Weltbild, Holtzbrinck Networks and T-Online Venture Funds. From 2009 until 2012 the company was managed by Cyrte Investments, part of Delta Lloyd. On 9 May 2012 the Dutch Koninklijke Ahold N.V. acquired Bol.com.

References

External links

Arts and crafts retailers
Book selling websites
Online retailers of the Netherlands
Ebook suppliers
Review websites
Ahold Delhaize